Urayama (written: 浦山) is a Japanese surname. Notable people with the surname include:

 (born 1956), Japanese actor and voice actor
 (1930–1985), Japanese film director and screenwriter

See also
, train station in Kurobe, Toyama Prefecture, Japan

Japanese-language surnames